Joilson Santana (born 3 January 1964) is a Brazilian boxer. He competed in the men's bantamweight event at the 1988 Summer Olympics.

References

1964 births
Living people
Brazilian male boxers
Olympic boxers of Brazil
Boxers at the 1988 Summer Olympics
Place of birth missing (living people)
Bantamweight boxers